The boys' 200 metre freestyle event at the 2018 Summer Youth Olympics took place on 8 October at the Natatorium in Buenos Aires, Argentina.

Results

Heats
The heats were started at 10:57.

Final
The final was held at 18:09.

References

Swimming at the 2018 Summer Youth Olympics